Lawrence Burnard Reade (21 October 1930 – 21 August 2019) was a New Zealand cricketer. He played 24 first-class matches for Central Districts between 1959 and 1963 and Hawke Cup cricket for Nelson from 1949 to 1973.

Lawrie Reade was educated at Nelson College from 1945 to 1946. An opening batsman, he had his most successful first-class season in 1960–61, when he scored 417 runs at an average of 37.90, and made his highest score, 163 against Northern Districts.

He was a stalwart for Nelson in the Hawke Cup, forming an opening partnership with his Central Districts partner Graeme Lowans during Nelson's hold on the title between 1958 and 1965, and scoring more than 2,000 runs.

Reade died at Richmond on 21 August 2019.

References

1930 births
2019 deaths
New Zealand cricketers
Central Districts cricketers
Cricketers from Nelson, New Zealand
People educated at Nelson College